Katalin Bimbó (born 1963) is a logician and philosopher known for her books on mathematical logic and proof theory. She earned a Ph.D. in 1999 at Indiana University, under the supervision of Jon Michael Dunn,
and is a professor of philosophy at the University of Alberta after having earned tenure there in 2013.

Selected works

Monographs
Generalized Galois Logics: Relational Semantics of Nonclassical Logical Calculi (with J. M. Dunn, CSLI Publications, 2008)
Combinatory Logic: Pure, Applied and Typed (CRC Press, 2012)
Proof Theory: Sequent Calculi and Related Formalisms (CRC Press, 2015)

Edited volumes
J. Michael Dunn on Information Based Logics (Outstanding Contributions to Logic, vol. 8; Springer, 2016).
Relevance Logics and other Tools for Reasoning.  Essays in Honor of J. Michael Dunn (Tributes, vol. 46; College Publications, London, UK, 2022).

References

External links
Home page

1963 births
Living people
Canadian logicians
Canadian women mathematicians
Canadian women philosophers
Mathematical logicians
Women logicians
Indiana University alumni
Academic staff of the University of Alberta